The Open Source application Bio7 is a software for ecological simulation models, image analysis and statistical analysis. Built upon the RCP framework of Eclipse it embeds several tools and programming languages for the analysis of complex ecological systems. Several Java based scripting languages (Groovy, BeanShell, Python/Jython, JavaScript, ImageJ Macro) and the Java language can be used from within Bio7 for the creation of simulation models and analysis tasks.
In addition, Bio7 also contains a complete Graphical User Interface for the statistical R programming language and the scientific image analysis tool ImageJ with special functions to send image data from ImageJ to R or R data to ImageJ.

References

Weblinks 

R (programming language)
Integrated development environments